Clement Burke (born Clement Anthony Bozewski; November 24, 1954) is an American musician who is best known as the drummer for the band Blondie from 1975, shortly after the band formed, throughout the band's entire career. He also played drums for the Ramones for a brief time in 1987, and performed under the name Elvis Ramone.

Life and career
Burke's early experiences behind the drum kit began in the late 1960s and early 1970s as one of the founding members of Bayonne's premier cover bands, Total Environment and Sweet Willie Jam Band. Burke also gained percussion knowledge from his stint as a drummer in the famed Saint Andrew Bridgmen Drum and Bugle Corps in Bayonne. Recruited by Debbie Harry and Chris Stein when Blondie was first forming in 1974, Burke joined Blondie in early 1975.
He was a key figure in keeping the group together after Stein and Harry considered disbanding, following the departure of original bassist Fred Smith to Television and he recruited his friend Gary Valentine to play bass. Burke's style of playing was influenced by Hal Blaine, Keith Moon, Ringo Starr, and Earl Palmer.

During the 1980s and 1990s, when Blondie was disbanded, Burke played drums for the Romantics (for whom Burke was the regular drummer between 1990 and 2004),  Pete Townshend, Bob Dylan, Eurythmics, Dramarama, the Fleshtones, Iggy Pop, and Joan Jett, amongst others. He went on to record with the line-up of Chequered Past in 1983 with Sex Pistols guitarist Steve Jones, former Blondie bandmate Nigel Harrison, musician Tony Sales and singer/actor Michael Des Barres.

In 1987, he stood in as drummer for the Ramones (under the name "Elvis Ramone") for two gigs, on August 28 in Providence, Rhode Island, and August 29 in Trenton, New Jersey at the punk club The City Gardens, after the sudden departure of Richie Ramone. On October 8, 2004, he once again played under the name "Elvis Ramone", when he joined Tommy Ramone, C. J. Ramone, and Daniel Rey in the "Ramones Beat on Cancer" concert.  He has recorded and played live with Wanda Jackson and Nancy Sinatra. Burke also played on the Go-Go's member Kathy Valentine's solo release Light Years in 2005. And he recorded and toured with Dramarama from Wayne, New Jersey and Los Angeles on their 1993 album Hi-Fi Sci-Fi.
Burke was inducted into the Rock and Roll Hall of Fame in 2006 as a member of Blondie.

In 2007, Burke joined Slinky Vagabond with David Bowie guitarist Earl Slick, Glen Matlock, and Keanan Duffty playing their debut concert at the Joey Ramone Birthday Bash in May 2007. He is also a member of Magic Christian (Dirty Water Records), along with Flamin' Groovies guitarist Cyril Jordan (on guitar) and Plimsouls lead guitarist Eddie Munoz (on bass) and toured several times as drummer with the Hugh Cornwell Band.

Burke played 90-minute sets at 100 concerts in a year and in 2008 it was reported that he had taken part in an 8-year study that analysed the physical and psychological effects of drumming and the stamina required by professional drummers, conducted jointly by the University of Gloucestershire and the University of Chichester. In July 2011, Burke received an honorary doctorate from the University of Gloucestershire, as a result of the drumming project.
 
In December 2011 he formed the band the International Swingers with Sex Pistols bass player Glen Matlock, guitarist James Stevenson of Generation X and singer Gary Twinn of Supernaut. About the same time he became a founding member of the Split Squad, participating in tours, appearances at SXSW festivals, and in the recording of the album, Now Hear This..., released in January 2014.

In April 2013, Burke appeared on the Little Steven song "All I Needed Was You" along with Scott Kempner, Barry Goldberg, Gregg Sutton and Tom Jr Morgan on the Carla Olson album Have Harmony, Will Travel. In 2014, Burke was a founding member of the Empty Hearts. The group recorded on 429 Records and his bandmates included the Romantics guitarist and vocalist Wally Palmar, the Chesterfield Kings bassist Andy Babiuk, the Cars guitarist Elliot Easton, and Small Faces and Faces pianist Ian McLagan. The band's self-titled first album was released August 5, 2014, and produced by Ed Stasium.

In 2015, via PledgeMusic, the band The International Swingers raised the money to record their first full-length self-titled album, The International Swingers (originally under the working title Whatever Works Now). The album was recorded at Studio 606 in LA which is owned by the Foo Fighters. It was then mixed by Peter Walsh who has worked with Simple Minds, Pulp and most recently Scott Walker.

In 2017 Burke played dates as a member of L.A.M.F., a Johnny Thunders tribute also featuring Walter Lure, Mike Ness, and Glen Matlock. The reunion shows in New York took place at the Bowery Electric in Manhattan on November 15 and 16 2016 (without Glen Matlock), and were recorded for the release on an album released on Jungle Records in December 2017.

In 2019 Burke played with Blondie tribute act Bootleg Blondie.

In December 2021, Burke filled in on drums for Gina Schock during The Go-Go's show at the Whisky a Go Go to celebrate their recent induction into the Rock and Roll Hall of Fame.

In 2008, Burke founded the Clem Burke Drumming project to investigate the physical and mental-health benefits of drumming.

Discography 
NOTE: This list includes albums in which Clem Burke was a band member or the featured drummer.

 With Blondie
 Blondie (1976)
 Plastic Letters (1977)
 Parallel Lines (1978)
 Eat to the Beat (1979)
 Autoamerican (1980)
 The Hunter (1982)
 No Exit (1999)
 The Curse of Blondie (2003)
 Panic of Girls (2011)
 Ghosts of Download (2014)
 Pollinator (2017)
 With The Adult Net
 The Honey Tangle (1989)
 With BP Fallon & The Bandits
 Still Legal (2013)
 With Carla Olson
 Have Harmony, Will Travel (2013)
 With Chequered Past
 Chequered Past (1984)
 With The Delphines
 The Delphines (1996)
 With Dramarama
 Hi-Fi Sci-Fi (1993)
 With The Empty Hearts
 The Empty Hearts (2014)
 The Second Album (2020)
 With Eurythmics
 In the Garden (1981)
 Revenge (1986)
 With Iggy Pop
 Zombie Birdhouse (1982)
 With The International Swingers
 The International Swingers (2015)
 With Jimmy Destri
 Heart on a Wall (1981)
 With Kathy Valentine
 Light Years (2005)
 With Magic Christian
 Evolver (2009)
 With Mark Owen
 Green Man (1996)
 With Miss Derringer
 Lullabies (2006)
 With Pete Townshend
 White City: A Novel (1985)
 With The Plimsouls
 Kool Trash (1998)
 With The Romantics
 Made in Detroit (1993)
 61/49 (2003)
 With The 69 Cats
 Transylvanian Tapes (2014)
 With The Split Squad
 Now Hear This... (2014)
 With Walter Lure 
 L.A.M.F. Live At The Bowery Electric (2017)

References

External links
Official Blondie website
The International Swingers' official website

1954 births
Living people
Ramones members
Blondie (band) members
American rock drummers
American punk rock drummers
American male drummers
American punk rock musicians
Musicians from Bayonne, New Jersey
The Adult Net members
American new wave musicians
New wave drummers
20th-century American drummers
The Romantics members
Dramarama members
The International Swingers members
Holy Holy (tribute band) members